Accused (Czech: Obžalovaný) is a 1964 film  directed by Ján Kadár and Elmar Klos. The film has won a Crystal Globe at 1964 Karlovy Vary International Film Festival.

Plot
Three men are taken to the District court - Chairman Kurdrna, Engineer Potůček and Bureaucrat Zelenka. They are accused of stealing national property. Zelenka and Potůček are guilty and confessed. Kudrna on the other hand refuses guilt. He didn't steal any of the property and didn't know about actions of the other two. He is shocked when he finds out that his deputy Ludl who was responsible for finances committed suicide due to his guilt. He eventually realises that he is also responsible because he signed some illegal premies without reading those. Zelenka and Potůček are sentenced to a long time in prison while Kudrna's sentence is low and correspondents with his custody but Kudrna feels guilt and refuses avoiding punishment.

Cast
Vlado Müller as Josef Kudrna
Zora Jiráková as Kudrna's mother
Martin Štěpánek as  Kudrna's son
Jaroslav Blažek as a Chairman of Judicial Senate
Pavel Bártl as Kábrt
Milan Jedlička as František Duchoň
Miroslav Macháček as Prosecutor
Jiří Menzel as František Horáček
Kamil Bešťák as Hruška

References

External links

1964 films
Czechoslovak drama films
Czech drama films
1960s Czech-language films
Courtroom films
Czech legal films
1960s Czech films